The Battle of Brentwood was a battle during the American Civil War on March 25, 1863, in Williamson County, Tennessee at Brentwood, Tennessee.

Battle

Union Lt. Col. Edward Bloodgood held Brentwood, a station on the Nashville & Decatur Railroad, with 400 men on the morning of March 25, 1863, when Confederate Brig. Gen. Nathan Bedford Forrest, with a powerful column, approached the town. The day before, Forrest had ordered Col. James W. Starnes, commanding the 2nd Brigade, to go to Brentwood, cut the telegraph, tear up railroad track, attack the stockade, and cut off any retreat.

Forrest and the other cavalry brigade made contact with Bloodgood about 7:00 am on March 25. A messenger from the stockade informed Bloodgood that Forrest's men were about to attack and had destroyed the railroad tracks. Bloodgood sought to notify his superiors and discovered that the telegraph lines were cut. Forrest sent in a demand for a surrender under a flag of truce but Bloodgood refused. Within a half-hour, Forrest had artillery in place to shell Bloodgood's position and had surrounded the Federals with a large force. Bloodgood surrendered.

Forrest and his men caused considerable damage during this expedition and Brentwood, Tennessee, on the railroad, was a significant loss to the Federals.

Modern Locations
 Johnson Chapel Road, along which General Forrest led his men to battle from the west, has been renamed Maryland Way. The approach would have started at the modern-day intersection of Maryland Way and High Lea Road in the River Oaks subdivision (36.036798, -86.821647). The troops proceeded east to what is now Franklin Road and Church Street (36.033407, -86.788866).
 The other Confederate brigade approaching from the east, under Colonel James Wellborn Starnes, established their position on a nearby hill, currently the Hilton Suites on Church Street (36.032563, -86.780939).
 Most of the battle took place around what is now the Shell station on the northwest corner of Franklin Road and Old Hickory Boulevard (36.038072, -86.787273).

References

 National Park Service battle description
 CWSAC Report Update

External links
 Graham, Stacy. "Battle of Brentwood (March 25, 1863)." Tennessee Encyclopedia of History and Culture, accessed December 25, 2014.

Battles of the Middle Tennessee Operations of the American Civil War
Battles of the Western Theater of the American Civil War
Confederate victories of the American Civil War
Battles of the American Civil War in Tennessee
Williamson County, Tennessee
Conflicts in 1863
1863 in Tennessee
Nathan Bedford Forrest
March 1863 events